Ceibwr Bay is a bay opening into the Irish Sea in Pembrokeshire, west Wales. It is about 7 km west of Cardigan, and 3 km south of the headland of Cemaes Head. It is owned by the National Trust, within the Pembrokeshire Coast National Park and on the Pembrokeshire Coast Path.

Geology

The elevated landscape at Ceibwr Bay is made up of spectacular cliff folds, part of the Nant Ceibwr valley leading through the village of Moylegrove, originally formed by glacial erosion. The river runs out into the Irish Sea through Ceibwr Bay.

The Ceibwr Bay Fault is a WSW-ENE-trending fault zone, that extends from the coast at Ceibwr Bay at its western end to the coast at Aberporth at its eastern end.

Features

Ceibwr Bay is in the Pembrokeshire Coast National Park and is owned by the National Trust. The landscape is a significant bird habitat (gulls, fulmar, shag, cormorant and chough) and its natural environment and geological features attract visitors all year round. Accessed by the Pembrokeshire Coast Path (part of the Wales Coast Path), its cliff-top walks are not recommended for sufferers of vertigo, but there are picnic areas. From the cliff path, it is possible to observe bottlenose dolphins and Atlantic grey seals.

To the south of the bay is the Witches' Cauldron (Pwll-y-wrach), a collapsed cave. Ceibwr Cove has a small stony beach beside the outflow of Nant Ceibwr and was once a port serving Moylegrove and the surrounding area.

See also
 Cardigan Bay Special Area of Conservation

References

Cardigan Bay
Bays of Pembrokeshire
National Trust properties in Wales
Nature reserves in Pembrokeshire